Michel Constandt (born 17 November 1938) is a Belgian fencer. He competed in the individual foil and épée events at the 1968 Summer Olympics.

References

External links
 

1938 births
Living people
Belgian male fencers
Belgian épée fencers
Belgian foil fencers
Olympic fencers of Belgium
Fencers at the 1968 Summer Olympics
People from Ixelles
Sportspeople from Brussels